This is a list of seasons completed by the Hartford Whalers of the World Hockey Association and National Hockey League. This list documents the records and playoff results for all 25 seasons that the Hartford Whalers completed from their founding in 1972 in the WHA until the franchise relocated to Greensboro, North Carolina, and eventually Raleigh to become the Carolina Hurricanes in 1997.

Season-by-season record

World Hockey Association

New England Whalers
Note: GP = Games played, W = Wins, L = Losses, T = Ties, Pts = Points, GF = Goals for, GA = Goals against

National Hockey League

Hartford Whalers Note: GP = Games played, W = Wins, L = Losses, T = Ties, Pts = Points, GF = Goals for, GA = Goals against

1Season was shortened due to the 1994–95 NHL lockout.

See also
List of Carolina Hurricanes seasons

References
New England Whalers seasons 1972–79 WHA history at hockeydb.com
Hartford Whalers seasons 1979–97 NHL history at hockeydb.com

Hartford Whalers
seasons